Bruce Sterling Jenkins (born May 27, 1927) is an American attorney, politician, and jurist serving as a senior United States district judge of the United States District Court for the District of Utah.

Early life and education

Born in Salt Lake City, Utah, Jenkins was in the United States Navy from 1945 to 1946, and then received a Bachelor of Arts degree from the University of Utah in 1949 and an Juris Doctor from the S.J. Quinney College of Law in 1952.

Career 
He was in private practice in Salt Lake City from 1952 to 1965. He was an assistant state attorney general of Utah in 1952, and a deputy county attorney of Salt Lake County, Utah from 1954 to 1958. He was a member of the Utah State Senate from 1959 to 1965. In 1965, Jenkins became a Referee in Bankruptcy for the District of Utah, and from 1973 to 1978 he was a United States Bankruptcy Judge for that district.

Federal judicial service

On August 28, 1978, Jenkins was nominated by President Jimmy Carter to a seat on the United States District Court for the District of Utah vacated by Judge Willis William Ritter. Jenkins was confirmed by the United States Senate on September 20, 1978, and received his commission on September 22, 1978. He served as chief judge from 1984 to 1993, and also taught as an adjunct professor, University of Utah from 1987 to 1988. He assumed senior status on September 30, 1994.

References

Sources
 

1927 births
Living people
University of Utah alumni
S.J. Quinney College of Law alumni
Utah state senators
Judges of the United States District Court for the District of Utah
United States district court judges appointed by Jimmy Carter
20th-century American judges
Judges of the United States bankruptcy courts
21st-century American judges